HD 92788 is a star in the equatorial constellation of Sextans. It has a yellow hue but is too dim to be visible to the naked eye, having an apparent visual magnitude of 7.31. The star is located at a distance of 113 light years from the Sun based on parallax, but is drifting closer with a radial velocity of −4.5 km/s. Two planets have been found in orbit around the star.

This is a G-type main-sequence star with a stellar classification of G6V. It is estimated to be around eight billion years old and is spinning with a rotation period of 31.7 days. The star has a similar mass to the Sun and is slightly larger in radius, with a high metallicity. It is radiating 1.25 times the luminosity of the Sun from its photosphere at an effective temperature of 5,722 K.

Planetary system
An extrasolar planet was discovered orbiting this star in 2001 by means of the radial velocity method. The star rotates at an inclination of 8 degrees relative to Earth. It is probable that this planet shares that inclination.

A low-mass brown dwarf companion was announced in 2019.

See also
 List of extrasolar planets

References

External links
 

G-type main-sequence stars
Planetary systems with two confirmed planets
Sextans (constellation)
BD–01 2431
092788
052409
J10424853-0211011